The Ultimate Collection is a double compilation album by Serbian and former Yugoslav rock band YU Grupa.

The album was released in 2009 by Croatia Records, a successor company for Jugoton, which was YU Grupa's record label during the 1972 – 1977 period, and the album features songs from the albums and 7" singles YU Grupa released through Jugoton during this period.

Track listing

Disc One
"Mali medved" (D. Jelić) – 5:40
"Bio jednom jedan pas" (M. Kostić) – 3:10
"U tami disko kluba" (D. Jelić, Z. Modli) – 4:11
"Kosovski božuri" (M. Kostić) – 4:43
"Šta će meni vatra" (D. Jelić, B. Marušić) – 4:38
"Trka" (D. Jelić, D. Nedimović) – 4:39
"Noć je moja" (D. Jelić, B. Marušić) – 5:44
"Čovek i marsovac" (D. Jelić, D. Nedimović) – 3:33
"Čudna šuma" (D. Jelić, D. Nedimović) – 3:34
"Devojko mala, podigni glavu" (D. Jelić, D. Nedimović) – 3:48
"Crni leptir" (D. Jelić) – 3:52
"More" (D. Jelić, D. Nedimović) – 5:43
"Drveni most" (D. Jelić) – 4:39
"Kako to" (D. Jelić, B, Marušić) – 4:38
"Ništa nema novo" (D. Jelić, B, Marušić) – 6:44
"More no. 2" (D. Jelić, B, Marušić) – 8:10

Disc Two
"Sama" (M. Kostić, V. Marjanović) – 4:11
"Živi pesak" (M. Kostić, P. Ćućuz) – 4:55
"Možda ti, možda ja" (D. Jelić, M. Tucaković) – 4:17
"Oprosti ljubavi" (D. Jelić, M. Tucaković) – 3:59
"Čovek kao ja" (D. Jelić, M. Tucaković, R. Đelmaš) – 3:37
"Ja moram dalje" (D. Jelić, M. Tucaković, R. Đelmaš) – 3:01
"Kad" (D. Jelić, M. Tucaković, Ž. Jelić) – 3:31
"Tačno u podne" (D. Jelić, Z. Modli) – 3:15
"3 do 6" (D. Jelić, M. Tucaković) – 3:27
"Među zvezdama" (D. Jelić) – 2:53
"Majko, žedan sam" (M. Kostić, M. Tucaković) – 3:51
"Budi sa mnom" (N. Maculja, D. Jelić) – 3:35
"Ne znam ni sam šta da ti dam" (D. Jelić) – 3:48
"Opasno (Opasno te volim)" (M. Kostić, M. Tucaković) – 4:12
"Razlog više da postojim" (M. Kostić, M. Tucaković) – 3:33
"Galebov let" (D. Jelić, Z. Modli) – 4:43
"Ideš mi na nerve" (M. Kostić, D. Jelić, M. Tucaković) – 3:50
"Identitet" (M. Kostić, M. Tucaković) – 3:50

Credits
Dragi Jelić – guitar, vocals
Žika Jelić – bass guitar, vocals
Bata Kostić – guitar
Nedžat Maculja – guitar
Miodrag Okrugić – organ
Velibor Bogdanović – drums
Ratislav Đelmaš – drums
Dragan Micić – drums

References
Bregovićevi uzori ponovo jašu

2005 compilation albums
Croatia Records compilation albums
YU Grupa compilation albums